The master of the cupbearers or master of the cup-bearers  (and ) was one of the high officials of the royal household in the Kingdom of Hungary. Masters of the cupbearers were included among the "true barons" of the realm from around 1220.

References

Sources 

 
 Stephen Werbőczy: The Customary Law of the Renowned Kingdom of Hungary in Three Parts (1517) (Edited and translated by János M. Bak, Péter Banyó and Martyn Rady with an introductory study by László Péter) (2005). Charles Schlacks, Jr. Publishers. .

Barons of the realm (Kingdom of Hungary)